Kildonan—Transcona is an historical electoral division in the Canadian province of Manitoba.  It was created for the 1949 provincial election, and eliminated with the 1958 provincial election.

Kildonan—Transcona was located to the immediate northwest of Winnipeg, covering such suburban communities as Transcona and East Kildonan.  It was won by the socialist Cooperative Commonwealth Federation (CCF) in both 1949 and 1953, but it was not considered a safe seat for the party.  Russell Paulley, who served as Transcona's MLA from 1953 to 1958, later became the provincial CCF leader in 1959.

In the 1953 election, Kildonan—Transcona's population was 19,944—significantly higher than any other single-member constituency in the province.  CCF leaders often pointed to this constituency as demonstrating the need for electoral reform in the province.

Provincial representatives for Kildonan—Transcona

Former provincial electoral districts of Manitoba